The Point is a 2006 film co-produced by Silo Productions and the National Film Board of Canada, filmed on location in Montreal. The movie, whose name is taken from the common name for one of the city's poorest neighbourhoods, Pointe-Saint-Charles, tells the story of a group of teenagers and how their lives intersect over the course of a weekend, with the story developed by teens, in workshops.

The Point was shot with a group of 40 teens from the neighbourhood, for a reported budget of $1 million. The film premiered at Festival du nouveau cinema, followed by screenings at the Rendez-vous du cinema quebecois and the Slamdance Film Festival.

See also 
 Docufiction
 List of docufiction films

References

External links 
   (Requires Adobe Flash)
 

2006 films
English-language Canadian films
National Film Board of Canada films
Canadian teen films
Films set in Montreal
Films shot in Montreal
Quebec films
Canadian docufiction films
Le Sud-Ouest
2000s English-language films
2000s Canadian films